Kurtamysh may refer to:
Kurtamysh Urban Settlement, a municipal formation which Kurtamysh Town Under District Jurisdiction in Kurtamyshsky District of Kurgan Oblast, Russia is incorporated as
Kurtamysh (inhabited locality), several inhabited localities in Kurgan Oblast, Russia
Kurtamysh River, a river in Kurgan Oblast, Russia on which the town of Kurtamysh stands